Benjamin Maio Mackay's Talk 2 Me! is an Australian podcast hosted by comedian, actor and director Benjamin Maio Mackay. The show launched in May 2014. The show is produced by Preachrs Podcast OnLine & OnStage.  By mid-2014 the show began receiving positive press, including articles on Books and Arts Daily and in The Australian.

Background
After concluding a 4-year Doctor Who podcast Maio Mackay wanted to launch an interview show, which he described as "a midpoint between The Graham Norton Show and Parky." Maio Mackay used his past podcast and ABC Radio hosting experience to coax early guests onto the show. The successful ratings convinced more guests to agree to interviews. He regularly works with publicists and conventions to arrange interviews with their talent. 

Most episodes of the show are generally recorded in Adelaide. The guest usually phones in, however on occasion Maio Mackay will travel to the guest. Occasionally people will confuse production company Preachrs Podcast OnLine & OnStage as the podcast's title. Preachrs Podcast was the name of Maio Mackay's first podcast, which was less-sucsefull, but he named his company after. The format is informative and conversational, with Maio Mackay often researching guests and their work. 

Talk 2 Me! was the first outlet to report that Fantastic Beasts and Where to Find Them would have 4 sequels and feature an appearance of a young Dumbledore. Maio Mackay has talked about his desire to transfer the podcast to a TV format.

Reception
Talk 2 Me! has received generally positive reviews, including positive writeups in The Australian and InDaily. The show purportedly reached 100 million downloads after an interview with David Yates, where Yates discussed exclusive details about Fantastic Beasts and Where to Find Them.

Episode list
Episode 1, 20 May, 2014: Lucy Durack & Jemma Rix
Episode 2, 9 June, 2014: Tim Ferguson
Episode 3, 7 July, 2014: Adam Hills
Episode 4, 26 July, 2014: Todd McKenney
Episode 5, 9 August, 2014: Rob Mills, Gretel Scarlett & John Paul Young
Episode 6, 23 August, 2014: Thomas Lacey & Phoebe Panaretos 
Episode 7, 6 September, 2014: Stuart Milligan & Richard O'Callaghan
Episode 8, 13 September, 2014: Francis Greensalde & Stephen Hunter
Episode 9, 12 October, 2014: John Tiffany & Madeleine Jones
Episode 10, 21 October, 2014: Andrew Hansen
Episode 11, 1 November, 2014: Sammy J & Matt Chan
Episode 12, 15 November, 2014: Matthew Reilly
Episode 13, 1 December, 2014: Ed Amatrudo
Episode 14, 24 December, 2014: Fawlty Towers The Dining Experience
Episode 15, 16 January, 2015: Maggie Wheeler
Episode 16, 23 January, 2015: Peter Davison
Episode 17, 15 February, 2015: Phil Davis
Episode 18, 28 February, 2015: Frank Woodley
Episode 19, 11 March, 2015: Justin Hamilton
Episode 20, 25 March, 2015: Duane Daniels
Episode 21, 10 April, 2015: Harry Lloyd
Episode 22, 28 April, 2015: Daran Norris
Episode 23, 6 May, 2015: Nick Jandl
Episode 24, 5 June, 2015: Rob Mills
Episode 25, 25 June, 2015: Zoe Wanamaker
Episode 26, 14 July, 2015: Hugh Fraser
Episode 27, 31 July, 2015: Jennifer Blake & Jon Hewitt
Episode 28, 26 August, 2015: Kevin "Dot Com" Brown
Episode 29, 3 September, 2015: Kurt Phelan
Episode 30, 30 September, 2015: David Alford
Episode 31, 3 November, 2015: Andrea Demetriades
Episode 32, 3 December, 2015: Ice Station Live Cast
Episode 33, 1 February, 2016: Wil Traval
Episode 34, 28 February, 2016: Mike Young
Episode 35, 22 March, 2016: Simon Stone
Episode 36, 29 March, 2016: Steven Williams
Episode 37, 8 April, 2016: Cody Christian
Episode 38, 24 April, 2016: Brent Hill, Esther Hannaford & Dean Bryant
Episode 39, 14 May, 2016: Colin Linden
Episode 40, 31 May, 2016: Hudson Leick
Episode 41, 1 June, 2016: Sammy J
Episode 42, 9 June, 2016: Kurt Phelan
Episode 43, 21 July, 2016: David Yates
Episode 44, 17 August, 2016: James Marshall
Episode 45, 26 August, 2016: Mark Collie
Episode 46, 2 September, 2016: James Millar
Episode 47, 4 October, 2016: Jason Watkins
Episode 48, 27 October, 2016: Brian Krause
Episode 49, 9 November, 2016: Stephen Hall
Episode 50, 9 November, 2016: Will Smith
Episode 51, 20 November, 2016: Greg Grunberg, Claudia Wells, Enver Gjokaj, Natalia Tena & Ian Bohen
Episode 52, 9 December, 2016: Anthony Rapp, Gretel Scarlett & Jack Chambers
Episode 53, 30 December, 2016: Brandon Victor Dixon & Midge Ure
Episode 54, 13 February, 2017: Vincent Rodriguez III
Episode 55, 27 February, 2017: David Stratton & George Solomon
Episode 56, 1 March, 2017: Trainspotting Live Cast
Episode 57, 9 March, 2017: Kourtney Hansen
Episode 58, 1 April, 2017: Arthur Darvill & Clive Standen
Episode 59, 15 May, 2017: Jessica Harmon, Stephanie Nadolny & Vic Mignogna 
Episode 60, 27 June, 2017: Christopher Judge, Johnny Yong Bosch 
Episode 61, 20 July, 2017: Riley Smith
Episode 62, 14 August, 2017: Timothy James Bowen 
Episode 63, 25 September, 2017: Jemma Rix
Episode 64, 2 October, 2017: Michael Grant Terry
Episode 65, 9 November, 2017: Laura Bailey & Brian Herring
Episode 66, 22 November 2017: Christian Kane, James Marsters, Graham McTavish, Shelley Hennig, Jodelle Ferland, RJ Mitte & Will Friedle
Episode 67, 4 December, 2017: Chris Morphew
Episode 68, 1 February, 2018: Jonathan Mangum & Warwick Thornton
Episode 69, 27 February, 2018: Kimble Rendall
Episode 70, 14 March, 2018: Walter Jones & Anjali Bhimani
Episode 71, 21 March, 2018: Brennan Elliott & Todd Haberkorn
Episode 72, 13 April, 2018: Stephen McKinley Henderson & Marielle Scott
Episode 73, 2 May, 2018: Aaron Cash & Rainee Blake
Episode 74, 29 May, 2018: Timothy James Bowen & Brina Palencia
Episode 75, 5 June, 2018: Trina Nishimura & Chris Parson
Episode 76, 19 July, 2018: Greg Sestero & Carlos Valdes 
Episode 77, 30 July, 2018: Kara Eberle & Karan Ashley
Episode 78, 14 August, 2018: Kyle Dean Massey & Elizabeth Maxwell
Episode 79, 4 September, 2018: William Jackson Harper
Episode 80, 26 September, 2018: Kimmy Robertson
Episode 82, 17 October, 2018: Arryn Zech, Drake Bell & Reggie Watts
Episode 83, 26 October, 2018: Julie Benz & Brad Sherwood
Episode 84, 1 November, 2018: Gareth David-Lloyd & Ryan Potter
Episode 85, 19 November, 2018: Maria Lewis
Episode 86, 4 December, 2018: Adam Campbell
Episode 87, 8 February, 2019: Ronan Raftery
Episode 88, 26 February, 2019: Rena Owen
Episode 89, 8 March, 2019: Striking Matches
Episode 90, 25 March, 2019: Lucie Pohl & Jonny Cruz
Episode 91, 1 April, 2019: Tom Allen, Troy Baker & Nolan North
Episode 92, 26 April, 2019: Dermot Crowley
Episode 93, 20 May, 2019: Corbin Bleu
Episode 94, 30 May, 2019: Eric Stuart & Bryce Papenbrook
Episode 95, 23 August, 2019: Kelli Barrett

References

External links

Audio podcasts
2014 podcast debuts